Michael Grant Rowbotham (born 2 September 1965) is a former South African footballer, who played as a midfielder for Manchester United, Grimsby Town and Wits University.

References

1965 births
Living people
English footballers
Footballers from Sheffield
Association football midfielders
English expatriates in South Africa
South Africa international soccer players
South African soccer players
Grimsby Town F.C. players
Manchester United F.C. players
English Football League players